CFAQ-FM is a Canadian radio station, airing a Christian music format at 100.3 FM in Saskatoon, Saskatchewan. Launched in 2006 by Bertor Communications, the station is branded as Free 100.3 FM.

References

External links
 Free 100.3
 
 

FAQ
FAQ
Radio stations established in 2006
2006 establishments in Saskatchewan